mod_mono is a module for the Apache HTTP Server that allows for hosting of ASP.NET pages and other assemblies on multiple platforms by use of the Mono development platform.

A similar module called mod_aspdotnet by another group allows hosting of ASP.NET pages and other assemblies with the Microsoft .NET Framework but because of that dependency, will only function on Microsoft Windows platforms.

The source code is written in the C programming language. It is licensed under Apache License 2.0 and hosted on GitHub.

See also

List of Apache modules

References

External links
 Mod mono 3.0.x is out (2013)
 mod_mono website
 mod_mono for windows for Apache 2.2.3 and 2.0.63 website (Do not work for even minor version number changes, absolute version required. (As at 6 March 2010)).
 Alternative : mod_aspdotnet website
 BitRock MonoStack Open source stack that includes ready to run Apache, mod_mono. (Discontinued as at 6 March 2010.)

Apache httpd modules
Mono (software)
Microsoft free software
Software using the Apache license
Articles with underscores in the title